In psychology, the subconscious is the part of the mind that is not currently of focal awareness.

Scholarly use of the term
The word subconscious represents an anglicized version of the French subconscient as coined in 1889 by the psychologist Pierre Janet (1859–1947), in his doctorate of letters thesis, De l'Automatisme Psychologique. Janet argued that underneath the layers of critical-thought functions of the conscious mind lay a powerful awareness that he called the subconscious mind.

In the strict psychological sense, the adjective is defined as "operating or existing outside of consciousness".

Locke and Kristof write that there is a limit to what can be held in conscious focal awareness, an alternative storehouse of one's knowledge and prior experience is needed, which they label the subconscious.

Psychoanalysis 
Sigmund Freud used the term "subconscious" in 1893 to describe associations and impulses that are not accessible to consciousness. He later abandoned the term in favor of unconscious, noting the following: 

In 1896, in Letter 52, Freud introduced the stratification of mental processes, noting that memory-traces are occasionally re-arranged in accordance with new circumstances. In this theory, he differentiated between Wahrnehmungszeichen ("Indication of perception"), Unbewusstsein ("the unconscious") and Vorbewusstsein ("the Preconscious"). From this point forward, Freud no longer used the term "subconscious" because, in his opinion, it failed to differentiate whether content and the processing occurred in the unconscious or preconscious mind.

Charles Rycroft explains that the subconscious is a term "never used in psychoanalytic writings". Peter Gay says that the use of the term subconscious where unconscious is meant is "a common and telling mistake"; indeed, "when [the term] is employed to say something 'Freudian', it is proof that the writer has not read [their] Freud".

Analytical psychology 

Carl Jung said that since there is a limit to what can be held in conscious focal awareness, an alternative storehouse of one's knowledge and prior experience is needed.

"New Age" and other modalities targeting the subconscious

The idea of the subconscious as a powerful or potent agency has allowed the term to become prominent in New Age and self-help literature, in which investigating or controlling its supposed knowledge or power is seen as advantageous. In the New Age community, techniques such as autosuggestion and affirmations are believed to harness the power of the subconscious to influence a person's life and real-world outcomes, even curing sickness. Skeptical Inquirer magazine criticized the lack of falsifiability and testability of these claims. Physicist Ali Alousi, for instance, criticized it as unmeasurable and questioned the likelihood that thoughts can affect anything outside the head. In addition, critics have asserted that the evidence provided is usually anecdotal and that, because of the self-selecting nature of the positive reports, as well as the subjective nature of any results, these reports are susceptible to confirmation bias and selection bias.

Psychologists and psychiatrists use the term "unconscious" in traditional practices, where metaphysical and New Age literature, often use the term subconscious. It should not, however, be inferred that the concept of the unconscious and the New Age concept of the subconscious are precisely equivalent, even though they both warrant consideration of mental processes of the brain. Psychologists and psychiatrists take a much more limited view of the capabilities of the unconscious than are represented by New Age depiction of the subconscious. There are a number of methods in use in the contemporary New Age and paranormal communities that affect the latter:

 Affirmations
 Autosuggestion
 Binaural beats
 Hypnosis
 Subliminal message

See also

 Consciousness
 Collective unconscious
 History of hypnosis
 Non-rapid eye movement sleep
 Preconscious
 Rapid eye movement sleep
 Slow-wave sleep
 Subliminal stimuli
 Unconscious mind
Transdisciplinary topics
 List of thought processes
 Philosophy of mind

Notes and references

External links

 A Reader's Guide To Pierre Janet: A Neglected Intellectual Heritage
 Who’s Minding the Mind?
 

Consciousness studies
Hypnosis

zh:潛意識